Mentonasc (Mentonasco  in Italian, Mentonnais or Mentonasque in French) is a Romance dialect historically spoken in and around Menton, France. It is classified as a dialect of Occitan and a sub-dialect of Vivaro-Alpine, with some strong influence from the neighbouring Intemelian Ligurian dialect spoken from Ventimiglia to San Remo.

Classification
Mentonasc is considered to be a transitional language; it is an intermediate language between Occitan and Ligurian, which is why the classification of Mentonasc is often debated. However, it is traditionally assigned to the Occitan language by French scholars and to Ligurian dialects by Italian scholars.

The Mentonasc dialect bears strong similarities with the common alpine dialects, such as, Royasque or Pignasque. It differs quite significantly especially in the ear from Ligurian coastal dialects (Northern Italian), like those of Ventimiglia (Intemelio dialect) or Monaco (Monégasque dialect).

History
When the area of Menton was part of the Republic of Genoa and later of the Kingdom of Sardinia, Mentonasc was used in all of the coastal area between Monaco and Ventimiglia, and in the hinterland. 

In the 19th century Mentonasc was used in the territories of the Free Cities of Menton & Roquebrune, an independent statelet created in connection with the Italian Risorgimento.

When France annexed the Free Cities in 1861, Mentonasc began its decline, substituted by the French language.

Geographic distribution
The Mentonasc dialect is currently spoken by about 10% of the population in Menton, Roquebrune, and the surrounding villages (Castellar, Castillon, Gorbio, Sainte-Agnès, Moulinet and Sospel). Now the language is being taught within the French educational system, as a variety of Niçard (i.e. Provençal and Occitan), so this may change.

Official status
No countries currently have Mentonasc as an official language.

Vocabulary
Below is a chart of some nouns and verbs found in French, translated into Mentonasc.

Literature 
There are some texts and songs that have been published recently in Menton (most from the twentieth century.)

Among the various publications:  A Lambrusca de Paigran (la Vigne vierge de Grand-père) by Jean-Louis Caserio, illustrations by M. and F. Guglielmelli, SAHM, Menton, 1987. Brandi Mentounasc, Livret de Poésies Bilingue by Jean Ansaldi, 2010. Ou Mentounasc per ou Bachelerà, le Mentonasque au Baccalauréat, by JL Caserio, 5th edition, 2008., etc.

Examples
 Video of the National Anthem of Menton being sung in Mentonasc

References
 Caserio, J. (2005, April 24). Lexiques français Mentonnais et Mentonnais Français. Retrieved February 10, 2016, from http://www.sahm06.com/spip.php?article14
 Dalbéra (1984) = Dalbéra, Jean-Philippe. Les parlers des Alpes Maritimes : étude comparative, essai de reconstruction [thesis], Toulouse: Université de Toulouse 2, 1984 [éd. 1994, London: Association Internationale d’Études Occitanes]
 Sumien (2009) = Sumien, Domergue. "Classificacion dei dialèctes occitans", Lingüistica Occitana 7, Septembre de 2009, p. 1-44. ISSN
 Venturini (1983) = Venturini, Alain. "Le parler mentonasque", Lou Sourgentin 56, April 1983

Notes

Articles in class projects/Rutgers
Occitan language
Provençal language
Languages of France
Menton